is a Japanese politician who serves as the Minister of Health, Labour, and Welfare since August 2022, previously serving from 2019 to 2020 and from 2017 to 2018. He also served as Chief Cabinet Secretary from 2020 to 2021. Belonging to the Liberal Democratic Party, he has been a member of the House of Representatives since 2003.

Born in Tokyo and a graduate of the University of Tokyo, Kato had a bureaucratic career in the Ministry of Finance before going into politics.

Early life and career

Kato was born as Katsunobu Murosaki on November 22, 1955, in Tokyo, Japan. He graduated from the Faculty of Economics in the University of Tokyo in 1979 and joined the Ministry of Finance. He held various post until being assigned secretary to the Minister of Agriculture Mutsuki Kato in 1994.

Katsunobu eventually married the daughter of Mutsuki Kato. As the family had only daughters, Katsunobu was adopted by his father-in-law to carry on the family name. The family was based in Okayama Prefecture where Kato would pursue his political career. He retired from the Ministry of Finance in 1995 and became his father-in-law's personal secretary.

Political career

After unsuccessful runs in 1998 and 2000, Kato was elected to the House of Representatives for the first time in the 2003 general election. He had initially ran as an independent as his father-in-law had left the LDP. However, fellow Okayama politician and former Prime Minister Ryutaro Hashimoto recruited him for the party and when elected, Kato joined the Heisei Kenkyukai led by Hashimoto. This was significant as Hashimoto and Mutsuki Kato had long been rivals in the political world of Okayama.

In August 2007, Kato became parliamentary vice minister to the Cabinet Office in the Abe Cabinet. He was retained until the end of the Fukuda Cabinet.

Kato became a confidant of Shinzo Abe. This was partially due to a family relationship. Mutsuki Kato had been a close ally of Shintaro Abe and his wife had remained a close friend of Shinzo's mother Yoko.

When Abe returned as Prime Minister in December 2012, Kato was appointed Deputy Chief Cabinet Secretary. In October 2015 he joined the cabinet for the first time as a minister of state with a portfolio including countermeasures against the declining birthrate and women's empowerment. After a reshuffle in August 2017 he became Minister of Health, Labour and Welfare. Kato left cabinet in October 2018 the become Chairman of the General Council, one of the four key posts in the LDP, but he was reappointed as Minister of Health, Labour and Welfare in September 2019. As such he directed Japan's initial response to the COVID-19 pandemic.

Abe resigned as Prime Minister in September 2020, and Kato became Chief Cabinet Secretary under his successor Yoshihide Suga. Kato held no significant post following the end of the Suga Cabinet, but when Kishida reshuffled the cabinet in August 2022 he was once again appointed Minister of Health, Labour and Welfare.

Katō is affiliated with the conservative organization Nippon Kaigi.

Honours
 : Grand Officer of the Order of Orange-Nassau (29 October 2014)

References

External links 
 Official website 

Members of the House of Representatives (Japan)
University of Tokyo alumni
People from Okayama Prefecture
Living people
1955 births
Members of Nippon Kaigi
Liberal Democratic Party (Japan) politicians
21st-century Japanese politicians
Chief Cabinet Secretaries of Japan
Ministers of Health and Welfare of Japan